Grovepoint Capital is a private equity firm headquartered in London, United Kingdom. It has additional offices in Israel. It was co-founded by Leon Blitz and Bradley Fried in 2010. In 2013, it acquired Algatechnologies, an Israeli biotech start-up, for $15 million-$20 million.

References

Private equity firms of the United Kingdom
Financial services companies based in London
Financial services companies established in 2010
2010 establishments in England
Ketura, Israel